The 2020 Euro Winners Cup was the eighth edition of the Euro Winners Cup (EWC), an annual continental beach soccer tournament for men's top-division European clubs. The championship is the sport's version of the better known UEFA Champions League in association football.

Organised by Beach Soccer Worldwide (BSWW), the tournament was held in Nazaré, Portugal.

The competition was supposed to take place from 29 May to 7 June. However, on 1 May, all BSWW tournaments were suspended until September because of safety concerns surrounding the COVID-19 pandemic. BSWW rescheduled the competition for 8–13 September. However, due to persisting travel restrictions and health worries deterring clubs from travelling, the pandemic caused the competition to happen on a smaller scale this year than in recent.

The competition began with a round robin group stage. At its conclusion, the best teams progressed to the knockout stage, a series of single elimination games to determine the winners, starting with the round of 16 and ending with the final. Classification matches were also played to determine other final rankings.

Braga of Portugal were the three-time defending champions, but lost on penalties in the final to Kristall of Russia who won their third title.

Teams

Qualification
Initially, entry requirements were as last year. To enter automatically, a club needed to be the champions of their country's most recent national championship (and for Europe's strongest leagues, the runners-up and third placed clubs could also enter). Any club that didn't meet these requirement was entitled to enter the accompanying Euro Winners Challenge (preliminary round) to take place in the days prior to the competition proper, as a last opportunity to qualify for the EWC main round.

But due to the effect of the COVID-19 pandemic on the competition, many eligible clubs were unable/did not want to participate due to travel restrictions and quarantine measures upon their repatriation.

Thus, the original rules regarding qualification were subsequently abandoned:

The Euro Winners Challenge (preliminary round) was cancelled.
Entry restrictions were relaxed: the event was opened up to simply any European club that wished to participate.

Entrants
27 clubs from 13 different nations entered the event.

Key: H: Hosts \ TH: Title holders

Venues

Two venues were used in one host city: Nazaré, Leiria District, Portugal.

Matches took place at Praia de Nazaré (Nazaré Beach) on one of two pitches. The Estádio do Viveiro (Viveiro Stadium) and an external purpose made pitch, located adjacent to the main stadium, simply known as Pitch 2.

Squads
Each club could submit a squad consisting of a maximum of 12 players. A maximum of four foreign players were allowed to be part of the squad, however only three of the four could be outfield players; if a fourth foreign player was to be rostered they must be a goalkeeper.

Draw
The draw to split the 27 clubs into six groups of four and one of three took place at 11:00 WEST (UTC+1) on 5 September in Nazaré, Portugal. The draw was conducted by the Mayor of Nazaré, Walter Chicharro and Portuguese beach soccer player, Madjer. The draw was closed to club representatives due to COVID-19 safety measures.

Seven clubs were seeded and automatically assigned to position one of each group: the host club, the reigning champions and the highest ranked club from the most recent national championship of each country ranked in the top five strongest European leagues, as per the BSWW League ranking (Portugal, Russia, Spain, Ukraine, Germany). The remaining 20 clubs were split into three pots, based on a combination their club ranking and the slot allocation for each country. One club from each pot was drawn into each group.

Two clubs from the same country could not be placed into the same group, save for Portuguese clubs (eight teams but only seven groups), however the two Sótão clubs must be kept separate.

Group stage
All times are local, WEST (UTC+1).

The top two teams from each group, and the best two third places teams, advance to the round of 16.

Group A

Group B

Group C

Group D

Group E

Group F

Group G

Ranking of third placed teams
The first, the second and the two best third placed teams advanced to knockout stage. Since groups A and D consisted of three teams, for the three first placed teams from the other groups (B, C, E, F, G), their results against the teams finishing in fourth place in their group were discounted for this ranking.

Knockout stage

Draw
The draw to determine the round of 16 ties and composition of the knockout stage bracket took place on 10 September after the conclusion of all group stage matches. It was conducted by the Mayor of Nazaré, Walter Chicharro, and Yuliia Dekhtiar, captain of Myria 2006, partaking in the women's tournament.

The 16 clubs were split into four pots of four based on their performance in the group stage, with the best performing clubs placed in Pot 1 down to the worst performing quartet in Pot 4:

Teams from Pot 1 were drawn against teams from Pot 4; teams from Pot 2 were drawn against teams from Pot 3. The drawing of ties alternated as such and were allocated to the bracket from top to bottom in the order they were drawn. However, teams that partook in the same group during the group stage could not be drawn against each other.

Bracket

Round of 16

Quarter-finals

9th–16th place

1st–8th place

Semi-finals

13th–16th place

9th–12th place

5th–8th place

1st–4th place

Finals

15th place match

13th place match

11th place match

9th place match

7th place match

5th place match

3rd place match

Final

Awards
The following individual awards were presented after the final.

Top goalscorers
Players with at least seven goals

22 goals
 Llorenç Gómez ( Artur Music)

21 goals
 Gabriele Gori ( Artur Music)

16 goals
 Glenn Hodel ( Grasshoppers)

14 goals

 Ihar Bryshtel ( Krylia Sovetov)
 Filipe da Silva ( Braga)

13 goals

 Kuman ( Marbella)
 Gaston Laduche ( Napoli Patron)
 Christian Biermann ( Real Münster)
 Eduard Suárez ( Molniya)

12 goals

 Oliver Romrig ( Beach Royals Dusseldorf)
 Mauricinho ( Kristall)

11 goals
 Pablo Perez ( Real Münster)

10 goals

 Oleg Zborovskyi ( Artur Music)
 Joscha Metzler ( Real Münster)

9 goals

 Salvador "Chiky" Ardil ( ACD O Sotão)
 Luca Addarii ( Beach Royals Dusseldorf)
 Rodrigo ( Kristall)
 Jordan Oliveira ( Braga)

8 goals

 Cristian Torres ( Marbella)
 Max Krötsching ( Rostocker Robben)

7 goals

 Lucio Carmo ( Os Nazarenos)
 Heirauarii Salem ( Newteam Brussels)
 Miguel Pintado ( Braga)

Source:

Final standings

See also
2020 Women's Euro Winners Cup
2019–20 UEFA Futsal Champions League

References

External links
Euro Winners Cup Nazaré 2020 , at Beach Soccer Worldwide
Euro Winners Cup 2020, at ZeroZero.pt (in Portuguese)

Euro Winners Cup
2020 in beach soccer
Euro
2020
Nazaré, Portugal
Euro Winners Cup